Downtown Los Angeles (DTLA) contains the central business district of Los Angeles. A 2013 study found that the district is home to over 500,000 jobs. It is also part of Central Los Angeles.

Downtown Los Angeles is divided into neighborhoods and districts, some overlapping. Most districts are named for the activities concentrated there now or historically, e.g. the Arts, Civic Center, Fashion, Banking, Theater, Toy, and Jewelry districts. It is the hub for the city's urban rail transit system plus the Pacific Surfliner and Metrolink commuter rail system for Southern California.

Banks, department stores, and movie palaces at one time drew residents and visitors of all socioeconomic classes downtown, but the area declined economically, especially after the 1950s. It remained an important center—in the Civic Center, of government business; on Bunker Hill, of banking, and along Broadway, of retail and entertainment for Hispanic Angelenos, especially immigrants. Now Downtown has been experiencing a renaissance that started in the early 2000s. The Crypto.com Arena anchors downtown's south end, and along Broadway, pre-war buildings are being restored for new uses, such as luxury condos, co-working spaces, and high-end retail.

History

The Tongva village of Yaanga was located in what is now downtown Los Angeles, possibly near or underneath where the Bella Union Hotel was located (now Fletcher Bowron Square).

Spanish and Mexican era

Father Juan Crespí, a Spanish Franciscan missionary charged with exploring sites for Catholic missions in California, noted in 1769 that the region had "all the requisites for a large settlement".  On September 4, 1781, Los Angeles was founded by a group of settlers who trekked north from present-day Mexico. Like most urban centers in the Spanish Empire, the town grew in a grid-like street patern around a central plaza which faced the first church. The area passed to American control in 1847, and the small town grew to 11,000 by 1880, The business district was centered along Main Street between the Plaza and First Street.

Victorian-era Downtown

Land speculation increased in the 1880s, which saw the population of the city explode from 11,000 in 1880 to nearly 100,000 by 1896. Infrastructure enhancements and the laying of a street grid eventually brought development south of the Plaza: Victorian Downtown Los Angeles in the 1800s and 1890s along Main, Spring and Broadway south to Third Street – all of which were razed to make way for today's Civic Center. After 1900, larger buildings were constructed along Broadway and Spring from Third to Ninth streets in what is now called the Historic Core.

Downtown's golden age
By 1920, the city's private and municipal rail lines were the most far-flung and most comprehensive in the world in mileage, even besting that of New York City. By this time, a steady influx of residents and aggressive land developers had transformed the city into a large metropolitan area, with DTLA at its center.

During the early part of the 20th century, banking institutions clustered around South Spring Street, forming the Spring Street Financial District. Sometimes referred to as the "Wall Street of the West," the district held corporate headquarters for financial institutions including Bank of America, Farmers and Merchants Bank, the Crocker National Bank, California Bank & Trust, and International Savings & Exchange Bank. The Los Angeles Stock Exchange was also located on the corridor from 1929 until 1986 before moving into a new building across the Harbor (110) Freeway.

Commercial growth brought with it hotel construction—during this time period several grand hotels, the Alexandria (1906), the Rosslyn (1911), and the Biltmore (1923), were erected—and also the need for venues to entertain the growing population of Los Angeles. Broadway became the nightlife, shopping and entertainment district of the city, with over a dozen theater and movie palaces built before 1932.

Department stores, most that had grown from local dry goods businesses, moved from Spring and Main streets around Temple and 1st, to much larger stores along Broadway, including The Broadway, Hamburger's, which became May Co., Robinson's, Bullock's, Coulter's, Desmond's, Silverwoods, Harris & Frank, and the Fifth Street Store/Walker's, serving a variety of socioeconomic groups from across the city and suburbs. All but Coulter's would, in the 1920s–1950s, launch branches dotting shopping centers across a growing Southern California. Numerous specialty stores also flourished including those in the jewelry business which gave rise to the Downtown Jewelry District. Among these early jewelers included the Laykin Diamond Company (later becoming Laykin et Cie ) and Harry Winston & Co., both of which found their beginnings in the Hotel Alexandria at Fifth and Spring streets.

The Los Angeles Union Passenger Terminal (Union Station) opened in May 1939, unifying passenger service among various local, regional, and long-distance passenger trains. It was built on a grand scale and would be one of the "last of the great railway stations" built in the United States.

Decline and redevelopment

Following World War II, suburbanization, the development of the Los Angeles freeway network, and increased automobile ownership led to decreased investment downtown. Many corporate headquarters slowly dispersed to new suburbs or fell to mergers and acquisitions. As early as the 1920s once-stately Victorian mansions on Bunker Hill were dilapidated, serving as rooming houses for 20,000 working-class Angelenos.

From about 1930 onward, numerous more-than-100-year-old buildings in the Plaza area were demolished to make way for street-level parking lots, the high demand for parking making this more profitable than any other options allowing preservation. The drastic loss of local downtown residents further reduced the viability of streetfront, pedestrian-oriented businesses. For middle- and upper-income Angelenos, downtown became a drive-in, drive-out destination.

In an effort to combat blight and lure businesses back downtown, the city's Community Redevelopment Agency undertook the Bunker Hill Redevelopment Project in 1955, a massive clearance project that leveled homes and cleared land for future commercial skyscraper development. This period saw the clearing and upzoning of the entire neighborhood, as well as the shuttering of the Angels Flight funicular railway in 1969. Angels Flight resumed operation in 1996 for a period of five years, shutting down once again after a fatal accident in 2001. On March 15, 2010, the railway once again opened for passenger service following extensive upgrades to brake and safety systems.

With Class A office space becoming available on Bunker Hill, many of DTLA's remaining financial corporations moved to the newer buildings, leaving the former Spring Street Financial District devoid of tenants above ground floor. Following the corporate headquarters' moving six blocks west, the large department stores on Broadway shuttered, culminating in the 1980s.

The Broadway theaters saw much use as Spanish-language movie houses during this time, beginning with the conversion of the Million Dollar Theater in the 1950s to a Spanish-language theater.

Recent years

In the early 2000s, the neighborhood became popular with Artists and Creatives due to low rent, open loft space, and many vacancies. In mid-2013, downtown was noted as "a neighborhood with an increasingly hip and well-heeled residential population".

Because of the downtown area's office market's migration west to Bunker Hill and the Financial District, many historic office buildings have been left intact, which is simply used for storage or remaining empty during recent decades. In 1999, the Los Angeles City Council passed an adaptive reuse ordinance, making it easier for developers to convert outmoded, vacant office and commercial buildings into renovated lofts and luxury apartment and condo complexes.

As of early 2009, 14,561 residential units have been created under the adaptive reuse ordinance, leading to an increase in the residential population.  With 28,878 residents in 2006, 39,537 in 2008, and over 60,000 in 2017, Downtown Los Angeles is seeing new life and investment.

Crypto.com Arena, which opened in 1999, has contributed immensely to the revitalization plans, adding 250 events and nearly 4 million visitors per year to the neighborhood. Since the opening of the Staples Center, the adjacent L.A. Live complex was completed, which includes the Microsoft Theatre and the Grammy Museum.
Los Angeles Metro Rail, a rail transit network centered on the downtown area, facilitates access to the city center, especially from the congested West Side.
Real estate developers and investors planned a $1.8 billion revitalization project along Grand Avenue, which included the development of Grand Park, a large city park, and the construction of major city landmarks, including the Frank Gehry-designed Walt Disney Concert Hall and contemporary art museum The Broad, which opened in 2015.
On August 7, 2007, the Los Angeles City Council approved sweeping changes in zoning and development rules for the downtown area. Strongly advocated by Mayor Antonio Villaraigosa, the changes allow larger and denser developments downtown; developers who reserve 15% of their units for low-income residents are now exempt from some open-space requirements and can make their buildings 35% larger than current zoning codes allow.
In 2009 Bottega Louie opened on the first floor of the historic Brockman Building on Grand Avenue and Seventh Street. It contributed to the revitalization of DTLA by creating Restaurant Row, which has since brought numerous new restaurants and retail shops to the area. In 2012, the upper 11 floors of the Brockman Building were bought with the intention of being sold as luxury lofts.
In October 2015, an outdoor lifestyle center, The Bloc Los Angeles, replaced the old enclosed Macy's Plaza.
Several labels of Warner Music moved into the  Los Angeles Arts District in 2019 where the company had purchased a former Ford Motor Company assembly plant.
 Broadway retail is transitioning from a broad mix of stores catering mostly to Hispanic immigrants and a burgeoning sneaker and streetwear retail cluster has emerged from 4th to 9th streets: Sneaker Row.
 Oceanside Plaza has planned to open in 2020, but this was later changed to unknown date due to financial problems and costs. This building includes a shopping mall, office, and a hotel and it is located in Staples Center.

Multiple Olympic and Paralympic events will be held in DTLA during the 2028 Summer Olympics and Paralympics.

After six years of construction, the new Sixth Street Viaduct opened on July 9, 2022 at a cost of $588-million. This new bridge replaced a 1932 viaduct of the same name which was demolished in 2016 due to a fact that it would collapse if there were a major earthquake, and alkali-silica reaction – colloquially known as “concrete cancer.” Pedestrian and bicycle access points link to other projects such as 12 acres of new park space below the viaduct.

In September 2022, it is announced that Oceanwide Plaza will restart work on stalled DTLA mega-project in 2023 following months of  rumors of a shortfall in financing and halt on construction on three years.

Geography

Downtown Los Angeles is flanked by Echo Park to the north and northwest, Chinatown to the northeast, Boyle Heights to the east, Vernon to the south, Historic South Central and University Park to the southwest, and Pico-Union and Westlake to the west.

Downtown is bounded on the northeast by Cesar Chavez Avenue, on the east by the Los Angeles River, on the south by the Los Angeles city line with Vernon, on the southwest by East Washington Boulevard and on the west by the 110 Freeway or Beaudry Avenue, including the entire Four Level Interchange with the 101 Freeway.

Districts
The neighborhood includes these districts:

Arts District
Bunker Hill
Civic Center (built on the razed site of the Central Business District during the 1880s–1890s)
Fashion District
Financial District
Flower District
Gallery Row
Historic Core (contains the Broadway Theater District, Spring Street Financial District and Old Bank District)
Industrial District
Jewelry District
Little Tokyo
Skid Row
South Park
Toy District
Wholesale District or Warehouse District

Climate

Population

The 2000 U.S. census found that just 27,849 residents lived in the 5.84 square miles of downtown—or 4,770 people per square mile, among the lowest densities for the city of Los Angeles but about average for the county. The Southern California Association of Governments estimates that downtown's daytime population is 207,440. The population increased to 34,811 by 2008, according to city estimates. By the end of 2019, the population of the district had grown to 85,000 residents, and 7,956 residential units were under construction. The median age for residents was 39, considered old for the city and the county.

Downtown Los Angeles is almost evenly balanced among the four major racial and ethnic groups—Asian Americans (23%), African Americans (22%), Latinos (25%) and non-Hispanic whites (26%)—according to an analysis of 2010 census data made by Loyola Marymount University researchers.

A study of the 2000 census showed that downtown was the second–most diverse neighborhood in Los Angeles, its diversity index being 0.743, outrated only by Mid-Wilshire. The ethnic breakdown in 2000 was Latinos, 36.7%; blacks, 22.3%; Asians, 21.3%; whites, 16.2%, and others, 3.5%. Mexico (44.7%) and Korea (17%) were the most common places of birth for the 41.9% of the residents who were born abroad, about the same ratio as in the city as a whole.

The median household income in 2008 dollars was $15,003, considered low for both the city and the county. The percentage of households earning $20,000 or less (57.4%) was the highest in Los Angeles County, followed by University Park (56.6%) and Chinatown (53.6%). The average household size of 1.6 people was relatively low. Renters occupied 93.4% of the housing units, and home or apartment owners the rest.

In 2000, there were 2,400 military veterans living downtown, or 9.7% of the population, considered a high rate for the city but average for the county overall.

In 2010, census data concluded that 40,227 people lived in Downtown Los Angeles.

In 2013, a study by Downtown Center Business Improvement District showed that of the 52,400 people resided in Downtown Los Angeles. The demographic breakdown was 52.7% Caucasian, 20.1% Asian, 17.0% Latino, and 6.2% African-American; 52.9% female, 47.1% male; and 74.8% of residents were between the ages of 23–44. The median age for residents was 34. The median household income was $98,700. The median household size was 1.8. In terms of educational attainment, 80.1% of residents had completed at least 4 years of college. The study was a self-selecting sample of 8,841 respondents across the DTLA area. It was not a "census" but rather a comprehensive survey of Downtown LA consumers.

An additional study by the Downtown Center Business Improvement District showed that by 2017 the population has reached 67,324.
In early 2020 the population was estimated to have exceeded 80,000 at the end of 2019.

Public transportation

Local and regional service

Downtown Los Angeles is the center of the region's growing rail transit system, with six commuter lines operated by Metrolink, as well as five rapid-transit rail lines and local and regional bus service operated by Los Angeles County Metropolitan Transportation Authority (Metro).

Major Metro stations in the district include Los Angeles Union Station, Civic Center/Grand Park station, Pershing Square station, 7th Street/Metro Center station, Pico station, and Little Tokyo/Arts District station.

The Los Angeles Metro Rail System has five rail lines that serve Downtown Los Angeles: the A Line, B Line, D Line, E Line, and the L Line.
In late 2009, the Metro J Line bus rapid transit project opened, replacing two unconnected bus rapid transit lines with through service at street level through the downtown area.
In 2006, a portion of the Metro Red Line (now the B Line) was rebranded by Metro as the Metro Purple Line (now the D Line), a heavy-rail subway line which runs from Union Station to Wilshire/Western station in Koreatown. A westward extension of the line to Westwood is currently under construction.
Metro operates an extensive bus network, including Metro Local, Metro Express commuter lines, and Metro Rapid buses with signal priority and limited stops.
Los Angeles Department of Transportation operates seven local DASH shuttle lines downtown on weekdays: Lines A, B, C, D, E and F.  Weekend service is operated on lines DD (Downtown Discovery), E and F.

Amtrak

Amtrak operates intercity passenger train service on five routes through Los Angeles Union Station: the Coast Starlight, Pacific Surfliner, Southwest Chief, Sunset Limited, and Texas Eagle.

Greyhound
Greyhound Lines operates a major bus terminal in Downtown Los Angeles at the intersection of Seventh and Alameda streets.

Service to Los Angeles International Airport
Los Angeles World Airports operates a direct shuttle, LAX FlyAway Bus, every 30–60 minutes between Union Station and Los Angeles International Airport.

Transit expansion

The Metro E Line was built in two phases and completed in 2016. The first phase of the project connected 7th Street/Metro Center Station downtown with Culver City via the former Pacific Electric Railway Santa Monica Air Line right-of-way. The second phase extended the line to Santa Monica.  The E Line shares tracks with the Metro A Line north of Washington Boulevard, and shares both the Pico Station and 7th Street/Metro Center Station with the A Line.
Los Angeles Union Station is set to be a major stop on the under-construction California High-Speed Rail system, though it will not be a part of the project's Initial Operating Segment. The project would connect Northern and Southern California via the San Joaquin Valley, with service averaging .
Under construction as of September 2014, the Regional Connector Transit Corridor will connect the A, E, and L Lines between the Little Tokyo/Arts District (which will be renamed "1st Street/Central") and 7th Street/Metro Center stations.
Work is planned to bring streetcar-style trolley service to Downtown Los Angeles via Broadway, connecting the L.A. Live development with the Grand Avenue cultural corridor and Bunker Hill.

Parks and open space

Downtown Los Angeles is home to several public parks, plazas, gardens and other open space:
Los Angeles Plaza
Olvera Street
El Pueblo de Los Ángeles Historical Monument
Cathedral of Our Lady of the Angels meditation garden and olive garden (park)
Biddy Mason Park
Grand Park
Maguire Gardens
Pershing Square
Los Angeles City Hall South Lawn
Los Angeles Police Department's Police Administration Building South Lawn
Los Angeles State Historic Park
Los Angeles Union Station gardens
Walt Disney Concert Hall Community Park
The Water Court at California Plaza, an outdoor performance and dining space with water features, fountains, shaded seating areas and an amphitheater.
Japanese Garden and plaza at the Little Tokyo Cultural and Community Center Plaza
Japanese Garden at the Kyoto Grand Hotel and Gardens
Garden at Bank of America Plaza

Several future park proposals for the district make use of public-private partnerships between developers and the city of Los Angeles, including a public park at the proposed Nikkei Center development in Little Tokyo; a  park at the Medallion development in the Historic Core; and a pocket park at the Wilshire Grand Hotel replacement project, currently under construction.

Additionally, the city recently completed a new park located on the 400 block of South Spring Street in the Historic Core neighborhood.

Skyline

Despite its relative decentralization and comparatively new high-rises (until 1958, the city did not permit any structures taller than the 27-story City Hall building), Los Angeles has one of the largest skylines in the United States, and its development has continued in recent years.

The skyline has seen rapid growth due to improvements in seismic design standards, which has made certain building types highly earthquake-resistant. Many of the new skyscrapers contain a housing or hotel component.

Some current and upcoming examples of skyscraper construction include:
705 Ninth Street, a 35-story residential tower, was completed in 2009.
717 Olympic, a 26-story residential tower, was completed in mid-2008.
888 Olive, a 32-story apartment tower by Vancouver-based Omni Group,  opened in 2015.
Concerto, a 28-story residential tower, was completed in early 2009.  A second phase (Tower II) is currently under construction.
The Grand Avenue Project, designed by architect Frank Gehry, is a multi-phase project on four parcels and will include a 39-story hotel tower at the corner of First Street and Grand Avenue and a civic park. The project has been delayed due to funding issues but is now back on track and progressing.
L.A. Live, a multi-phased dining, entertainment and hotel development that includes a Ritz-Carlton and JW Marriott Hotel hybrid as well as Ritz-Carlton-branded condominiums, was completed in February 2010.
Marriott International completed a 24-story Courtyard and Residence Inn tower near L.A. Live, which opened in July 2014, and plans to build a 20+ story Renaissance hotel to open in 2016.
Metropolis, a mixed-use four-tower project (60, 50, 38, and 19 stories) at Francisco and Ninth streets, is currently under construction.
South, a three-tower complex called Elleven, Luma, and Evo, spans the block from 11th Street and Grand Avenue to 12th Street and Grand Avenue, and was completed in phases ending in early 2009.
Figueroa Centre, a 975-foot residential and hotel tower proposed across from The Original Pantry restaurant on the Figueroa Corridor. The tower proposed will become the third tallest building in Los Angeles when completed.
Angels Landing, a proposed super tall tower at 1020 ft. Currently in the funding stage. Approved by the city council in 2017.

Building height limits: 1904–1957

The first height limit ordinance in Los Angeles was enacted following the completion of the 13-story Continental Building, located at the southeast corner of Fourth and Spring streets. The purpose of the height limit was to limit the density of the city. There was great hostility to skyscrapers in many cities in these years, mainly due to the congestion they could bring to the streets, and height limit ordinances were a common way of dealing with the problem. Exceptions were granted for decorative towers such as those later built on the Eastern Columbia Building and United Artists Theatre, as well as the now-demolished Richfield Tower.

The 1911 ordinance was repealed in 1957. The first private building to exceed the old limit was the 18-story United California Bank Building, located at the southeast corner of Sixth and Spring streets.

Flat Roof Ordinance
The pattern of buildings in Los Angeles to feature these "flat roofs" was the result of a 1974 fire ordinance which required all tall buildings in the city to include rooftop helipads in response to the devastating 1974 Joelma Fire in Sao Paulo, Brazil, in which helicopters were used to effect rescues from the flat rooftop of the building. The Wilshire Grand Center was the first building granted an exception by the Los Angeles City Fire Department in 2014. However, as the building was under construction, L.A. City Council removed the flat roof ordinance as of 2015.

Government and infrastructure

The Los Angeles County Department of Health Services operates the Central Health Center in Downtown Los Angeles.

The Southern California Liaison of the California Department of Education has its office in the Ronald Reagan State Building in Downtown Los Angeles.

The Federal Reserve Bank of San Francisco, Los Angeles Branch is located in Downtown Los Angeles.

Economy
DTLA is a node in the tech economy that extends beyond Silicon Beach. A venture capital firm counted 78 tech-oriented firms in DTLA in 2015. This included mobile apps, hardware, digital media and clean-tech companies plus co-working spaces, start-up incubators, and other related businesses.

The Arts District has become a popular spot for companies seeking out something different from typical modern offices. The central location is accessible from various parts of the Los Angeles Basin. The cultural life has also made the area attractive to young tech employees.

Anschutz Entertainment Group has its corporate headquarters in Downtown Los Angeles. BYD Company, a Chinese technology firm, has its North American headquarters in Downtown Los Angeles.

The Last Bookstore is an independent bookstore that was called California’s largest new and used bookstore by Conde Nast Traveler in 2019. Cathay Bank has its headquarters in the Los Angeles Chinatown.

Education

Downtown residents aged 25 and older holding a four-year degree amounted to 17.9% of the population in 2000, about average in the city and the county, but there was a high percentage of residents with less than a high school diploma.

These are the elementary or secondary schools within the neighborhood's boundaries:
 Ramon C. Cortines School of Visual and Performing Arts, LAUSD high school, 450 N. Grand Ave.
 Downtown Business High School, LAUSD alternative, 1081 W. Temple St.
 California Academy for Liberal Studies Early College High School, LAUSD charter, 700 Wilshire Blvd.
 Alliance Dr. Olga Mohan High School, LAUSD charter, 644 W. 17th St.
 Abram Friedman Occupational School, LAUSD adult education, 1646 S. Olive St.
 Metropolitan Continuation School, LAUSD, 727 S. Wilson St.
 Para Los Ninos Middle School, LAUSD charter, 1617 E. Seventh St.
 Jardin de la Infancia, LAUSD charter elementary, 307 E. Seventh St.
 Saint Malachy Catholic Elementary School, private, 1200 E. 81st St.
 Tri-C Community Day School, LAUSD, 716 E. 14th St.
 City of Angels School, LAUSD alternative school, 1449 S. San Pedro St. (formerly Central High School)
 San Pedro Street Elementary School, LAUSD, 1635 S. San Pedro St.
 Saint Turibius Elementary School, private, 1524 Essex St.
 American University Preparatory School, private, 345 S. Figueroa St.

The Fashion Institute of Design & Merchandising is at 800 S. Hope St., and the Colburn School for music and the performing arts is at 200 S. Grand Ave.

Emergency services

Hospitals
Dignity Health-California Hospital Medical Center is located in the South Park district of Downtown LA at 1401 S. Grand Ave. Dignity Health-California Hospital Medical Center is known for its wide range of medical services, from women's health and maternal child to orthopedics and cardiology. The hospital also operates the only Level II Trauma Center in Downtown Los Angeles, and its emergency room treats over 70,000 patients each year. The hospital's neighbors include Staples Center, L.A. Live, Fashion Institute of Design & Merchandising and the Fashion District.

Fire services
The Los Angeles Fire Department operates the following fire stations in Downtown Los Angeles:

 Station 3 (Civic Center/Bunker Hill)
 Station 4 (Little Tokyo/Chinatown/Union Station/Olvera Street)
 Station 9 (Central City/Skid Row)
 Station 10 (Convention Center area)

Police services

The Los Angeles Police Department operates the Central Area Community Police Station in Downtown Los Angeles.

See also

 Central Business District, Los Angeles (1880–1899)
 LAMP Community
 List of tallest buildings in Los Angeles
 Los Angeles Downtown News

References

External links

Central City Association of Los Angeles
Blogdowntown community site
Downtown Los Angeles Art Walk, a California public benefit company
Downtown Los Angeles neighborhood guide
Downtown Los Angeles crime map and statistics
USC Dornslife Downtown Walking Tour
Image of Downtown Los Angeles and Glendale Freeway seen from Eagle Rock, California, 1984. Los Angeles Times Photographic Archive (Collection 1429). UCLA Library Special Collections, Charles E. Young Research Library, University of California, Los Angeles.
 DowntownLA, Downtown Center Business Improvement District

Videos

 
Los Angeles
Central Los Angeles
Economy of Los Angeles
Neighborhoods in Los Angeles